2K15 may refer to:

 the year 2015
 NBA 2K15, 2014 video game
 WWE 2K15, 2014 video game